The Bugoma Forest is a protected tropical forest that is situated southwest of Hoima and  northeast of Kyenjojo towns, and east of Lake Albert, in the Hoima district of western Uganda. It was gazetted in the 1930s and came under the mandate of the National Forestry Authority (NFA) in 2003.

Setting and structure
It is one of a belt of extensive, lowland forests along Uganda's western rift escarpment, that are believed to have been connected with one another and the Ituri forest in former times. The forest belt is situated between 500 and 1,650 metres a.s.l., and Bugoma is situated at between 990 and 1,300 m elevation. Regional rainfall ranges from 1 250 to 1,625 mm. Farmlands and regenerating vegetation fringe the forests, which includes Elephant grass and Hyparrhenia grassland.

The tree cover of the forest belt shows a tendency toward monospecific dominance. Early colonising forest consists of a mixed forest with Alstonia congensis, Trichilia prieuriana, Khaya anthotheca, Celtis mildbraedii, and Cynometra alexandri (Uganda ironwood), among others. The climax forest that develops afterward depends on the altitude. From 1 000 to 1 200 m Cynometra alexandri is highly dominant. Lasiodiscus mildbraedii and sometimes by Celtis spp. and Strychnos mitis sometimes dominate the understorey. Very large trees other than Cynometra alexandri occur, such as Khaya spp. and Entandrophragma spp. Patches of characteristic colonising species (e.g. Maesopsis spp.) mature alongside climax canopy species in a mosaic pattern in spaces left by the fall of large trees. Another type of climax community is the Parinari forest, consisting of almost pure stands of Parinari excelsa, associated in the understorey with Carapa grandiflora. Other understorey species are Craterispermum laurinum, Trichilia prieuriana and Pleiocarpa pycnantha.

Wildlife
23 species of mammal, 225 species of bird, and 260 species of tree are known to occur in the reserve. The forest is home to a considerable number of chimpanzees which have started to undergo the habituation process in January 2016.

Conservation status
The forest is threatened by illegal logging, and it is feared that it may succumb to settlement and agriculture. The situation is worsened by an influx of Congolese refugees, and burgeoning large-scale tea and tobacco farms on its outskirts that infringe on the reserve boundaries.

In March 2012 some 1,500 land invaders were evicted, but by December 2013 some of them were returning to start subsistence cultivation and pit sawing.

In August 2020, Nema issued a certificate to Hoima Sugar Company to turn 22 sq miles of the forest into sugarcane plantation, an urban trading and settlement centre among others. This land area is extremely big with a variety of trees and grass species and other forms of nature/creation.

See also
 Central Forest Reserves of Uganda

References

External links
Bugoma Forest: Court orders commissioner to avail documents

Tropical and subtropical moist broadleaf forests
Forests of Uganda
Forest reserves of Uganda
Hoima District